

Nutrition education is a set of learning experiences designed to assist in healthy eating choices and other nutrition-related behavior. It includes any combination of educational strategies, accompanied by environmental supports, designed to facilitate voluntary adoption of food choices and other food and nutrition-related behaviors conducive to health and well-being. Nutrition education is delivered through multiple venues and involves activities at the individual, community, and policy levels. Nutrition Education also critically looks at issues such as food security, food literacy, and food sustainability.

Overview 
Nutrition education promotes healthy-eating and exercise behaviors. The work of nutrition educators takes place in colleges, universities and schools, government agencies, cooperative extension, communications and public relations firms, the food industry, voluntary and service organizations and with other reliable places of nutrition and health education information. Nutrition education is a mechanism to enhance awareness, as a means to self-efficacy, surrounding the trigger of healthy behaviors.

United States

National Education and Training (NET) program 
In 1969, a recommendation from the White House Conference on Food, Nutrition, and Health stated that nutrition education should be part of school curriculums. It was authorized under the Children Nutrition Act. In 1978, the Nutrition Education and Training (NET) program was created by the USDA, with the purpose of giving grants to help fund nutrition education programs under state educational systems. Funding for the program was targeted towards school children, teachers, parents, and service workers. In its inaugural year, the program was funded with $26 million gradually decreasing to $5 million in 1990. In 1996, NET was restored to temporary status.<ref name="About">About Nutrition Reviews, Oxford Academic. Accessed 29 November 2018.</ref>

 Current government oversight 
The United States government agency tasked with providing nutrition education and establishing dietary guidelines based on current scientific literature is the United States Department of Agriculture. Through many of their programs, children and low-income citizens can access food that otherwise would be unavailable. Two agencies within the USDA's Food, Nutrition, and Consumer Services are the Food and Nutrition Service and the Center for Nutrition Policy and Promotion. The main objectives of the Food and Nutrition Service are to use their 15 federal nutrition assistance programs to help reduce the risk of obesity and ensure that hunger is no longer a concern for US citizens. Some of their programs include WIC, Supplemental Nutrition Assistance Program (SNAP), and school meals. The Center for Nutrition Policy and Promotion (CNPP) on the other hand, was established in 1994, and is responsible for developing dietary guidelines based on scientific evidence and then promotes them to the consumer through nutrition programs such as MyPlate.

 Legislation 
The Healthy, Hunger-Free Kids Act of 2010 passed by the Obama administration in 2010 included provisions that led to reforms that established minimum requirements that all food and beverages sold on schools' campuses must meet. The new standards include limits on the amount of sugar, sodium, and calories from saturated fat that specific foods may contain per item.

The Public Health Service Act was enacted in 1944 and broadened the scope of the Public Health Service functions. IMPACT (The Improved Nutrition and Physical Activity Act) was a piece of legislation introduced in the Senate in 2005 aimed to amend the Public Health Service Act in reducing obesity among children. It called for a grants to include the identification, treatment, and prevention of eating disorders and obesity.

 Examples of government agencies that incorporate nutrition education into their programs, include 
 Let's Move, launched by First Lady Michelle Obama in February 2010, this program is a comprehensive learning approach that brings in the all aspects of child health, through the Healthier US School Challenge;
 USDA Food and Nutrition Service, which provides nutrition education materials to children and adults of all ages and nutrition education to Supplemental Nutrition Assistance Program (SNAP) participants and applicants;
 USDA National Institute of Food and Agriculture through the cooperative extension program; and
 MyPyramid.gov, through the Ten Tips Nutrition Education Series.
 MyPlate, a program started through the FDA that helps come up with a personalized diet depending on your age, height, weight, sex, and physical activity.

 In school 

 K-12 
Nutrition education programs within schools try to create behaviors that prevent students from potentially becoming obese, developing diabetes and cardiovascular issues, and forming negative emotional issues by educating students on the aspects of a healthy diet, emphasizing the consumption of lower fat dairy options and both fruits and vegetables. As most children eat between one and two of their meals at school, school-based nutrition education programs offer opportunities for students to practice making healthy eating decisions. However, due to influences outside of the school environment such as home, cultural, and social environments, there may be a lack of visible desired behavior changes. The National Center for Health Statistics October 2017 data brief, found that the prevalence of obesity among youth ages 2–19 has increased from 13.9 to 18.5 percent from 1999 to 2016.

 College 
With eating behaviors, such as missing meals throughout the day and engaging in potentially dangerous self-prescribed weight loss methods, combined with a diet consisting of foods high in sodium, cholesterol and saturated fats, college students' dietary habits can potentially negatively affect their current and future health. A typical college student's diet does not contain enough vitamins, minerals or fiber. Limited in both the consumption of fruit and vegetables, research has shown that enrollment in a university nutrition class, emphasizing the consumption of fruits and vegetables and certain dietary habits that prevent chronic disease, significantly increased the students consumption of fruits and vegetables compared to their baseline consumption levels.

 Current issues 
Childhood obesity is a public health concern. In a recent study done by medical researchers, from 2011-2012, 8.4% of young children ages 2–5, 17.7% of kids ages 6–11, and 20.5% of teens ages 12–19 are categorized as obese in the U.S. Besides nutrition education, environmental factors such as a decrease in physical activity and increase in energy intake have led to more sedentary children. This increase in body mass index has led to hypertension, metabolic syndrome, and type 2 diabetes among other chronic diseases. Poor nutrition habits and lack of physical activity have led to this increase of obesity that leads from childhood to adulthood. A lack of funding and insufficient resources have led to poor nutrition education. Lack of funding has led to schools developing contracts with private companies such as soda and candy companies that allow vending machines and other products as well and has created a monopoly in public schools.

Nutrition based policies use a trickle-down methods: federal, regional, state, local and school district policies. Teachers have a more direct influence in nutrition education. There are not a lot of studies that show how nutrition education policies affect the teachers in the schools they are meant to influence.

 Additional publications 
 The Journal for Nutrition Education and Behavior, the official journal of the Society for Nutrition Education and Behavior, documents and disseminates original research, emerging issues and practices relevant to nutrition education and behavior worldwide.
 The Journal of School Health, the journal that provides information regarding the roles of schools, school personnel, and the environment in regards to the health development of young children.
 Nutrition Reviews'' is a journal that publishes new literature reviews on current topics such as clinical nutrition and nutrition policy.

See also 

 5 A Day
 Food guide pyramid
 Fruits & Veggies – More Matters
 Healthy diet
 Healthy eating pyramid
 History of USDA nutrition guides
 Human nutrition

References

External links 
 Society for Nutrition and Behavior
 the ketogenic diet meal plan

 
Dietetics